Antonio Folc de Cardona y Enriquez, Viceroy of Sardinia, 1534 - 1549, deceased 1555,   was a cadet  son of Joan Ramon Folc de Cardona, 1st Duke of Cardona, a.k.a. Joan Ramon Folc IV de Cardona,  (1446 - Arbeca,  1513), title awarded in 1482 by Ferdinand II of Aragon and Isabel I of Castile, Marquis of Pallars since 1491, title awarded by the same Royal Couple, 5th Count of Cardona till 1482 and "Aldonza Enriquez y Fernandez de Quiñones", Lady of Elche and Crevillente, born 1450, married 1467,   9th child from the second marriage of Fadrique Enriquez, 2nd hereditary Admiral of Castile, deceased 23 September 1473, with "Teresa Fernandez de Quiñones y de Luna", 4 males/5 females.

He married "Ana Maria de Requesens y Enriquez", daughter of seafarer and naval commander  Galceran de Requesens, 1st Count of Palamós, (1439 - Barcelona, 1505).

Their 7 children, 2 males/5 females,  were: 

Juan de Cardona y Requesens, Baron of  Sant Boi, Captain General of the Galleys of Sicily and Naples, Viceroy of Navarre, 1595 - 1610. With issue.
Margarita Folch de Cardona y Requesens, deceased 23 February 1609. She married, 1553, " Adam Herr zu Dietrichstein-Nikolsburg", (9 October 1527 - 5 January 1590), closely associated and family related to  Rudolf II, Holy Roman Emperor. With issue.
Francesc de Cardona.
Anna de Cardona, Baroness of Sant Boi. Married twice. With issue in Sardinia island.
Beatriu de Cardona. With Spanish-Calabrese nobility issue.
Jeronima de Cardona.
Joana de Cardona

References
http://www.grandesp.org.uk/historia/gzas/cardonadq.htm

Viceroys of Sardinia
Spanish untitled nobility
16th-century Spanish people
1555 deaths
Year of birth unknown